Under17 (stylized as UNDER17) was a Japanese musical duo formed in 2001 by Haruko Momoi and Masaya Koike. The group was known for producing music known colloquially as " songs", providing theme and insert songs to series such as Tenbatsu! Angel Rabbie, Popotan, and DearS.

History

Some of the anime series where Under17 songs have been featured are Mouse, Popotan, Tenbatsu! Angel Rabbie, Hourglass of Summer, DearS, and Kujibiki Unbalance. This group has released several adult videogames' opening songs. On 27 September 2004, it was announced that Under17 would break up after their national tour, with Momoi and Koike going separate ways due to creative differences. Their final concert was held on 20 November 2004 at the Yokohama Blitz. Momoi officially embarked on a solo career and Koike formed the band MOSAIC.WAV.

The band reunited for one song on 31 August 2008 during the Animelo Summer Live, performing "Tenbatsu! Angel Rabbie" with the members of MOSAIC.WAV.

Momoi and Koike briefly reunited again in March 2020 to perform at the event Susume Moe Denpa Shōnen!! Daifukkatsusai 2020!!: Sugisarishi Moe o Motomete.

Members
  (vocals)
  (guitar)

Discography

Compilation albums

Singles

References

Japanese pop music groups
Anime musical groups
Japanese musical duos
Musical groups established in 2001
Musical groups disestablished in 2004